The 1992 Indian vice-presidential election was held on 19 August 1992 to elect Vice-President of India. K. R. Narayanan defeated Kaka Joginder Singh to become 9th Vice-President of India. Out of 701 valid votes, Narayanan received 700 votes, while Singh secured only one vote. At the time of the election, VP office was vacant since the incumbent, Shankar Dayal Sharma, had already inaugurated as President following his victory in the presidential election.

Candidates

Result

|- align=center
!style="background-color:#E9E9E9" class="unsortable"|
!style="background-color:#E9E9E9" align=center|Candidate
!style="background-color:#E9E9E9" |Party
!style="background-color:#E9E9E9" |Electoral Votes
!style="background-color:#E9E9E9" |% of Votes
|-
| 
|align="left"|K. R. Narayanan||align="left"|INC||700||99.86
|-
|
|align="left"|Kaka Joginder Singh||align="left"|Independent||1||0.14
|-
| colspan="5" style="background:#e9e9e9;"|
|-
! colspan="3" style="text-align:left;"| Total
! style="text-align:right;"|701
! style="text-align:right;"|100.00
|-
| colspan="5" style="background:#e9e9e9;"| 
|-
|-
|colspan="3" style="text-align:left;"|Valid Votes||701||98.59
|-
|colspan="3" style="text-align:left;"|Invalid Votes||10||1.41
|-
|colspan="3" style="text-align:left;"|Turnout||711||90.00
|-
|colspan="3" style="text-align:left;"|Abstentions||79||10.00
|-
|colspan="3" style="text-align:left;"|Electors||790|| style="background:#e9e9e9;"|
|-
|}

See also
1992 Indian presidential election

References

Vice-presidential elections in India
India